Hellmut von der Chevallerie (9 November 1896 – 1 June 1965) was a general in the Wehrmacht of Nazi Germany during the World War II, who commanded the 13th Panzer Division. He was a recipient of the Knight's Cross of the Iron Cross.

World War II
On 9 March 1942 Chevallerie took command of the 10th Rifle Brigade, and kept this command after its re-designation as 10th Panzergrenadier Division. After spending parts of the summer 1942 in reserve, he took command of 22nd Panzer Division on 8 October 1942, which was in reserve in the Don River curve at the time. On 1 November 1942 he was promoted to Generalmajor and was given command of 13th Panzer Division, which he led into the Battle of the Caucasus. Severely wounded just one month into his command, he had to give up his command to his deputy Wilhelm Crisolli on 1 December 1942, and did not return to command until 15 May 1943. In the meantime, he had been awarded Knight's Cross of the Iron Cross on 30 April 1943 and had been promoted to Generalleutnant on 1 May 1943. On 25 October 1943 he was wounded again and was moved to the reserve (Führerreserve).

On 15 November 1943 he took command of the 273rd Reserve Panzer Division in the southwest of France, and went back into the reserve on 10 May 1944. On 15 August 1944 he took command of 233rd Reserve Panzer Division in Denmark. On 1 November 1944 he was given command of the Truppenübungsplatz Bergen, and went back into reserve on 20 February 1945. On 1 April 1945 he took command of the Sudetengau, which he handed over on 9 May 1945 upon the capitulation of Germany, and entered confinement as a prisoner-of-war until June 1947.

Awards and decorations
 Clasp to the Iron Cross (1939) 2nd Class (8 July 1941) & 1st Class (20 July 1941)

 Knight's Cross of the Iron Cross on 30 April 1943 as Generalmajor and commander of 13. Panzer-Division

References

Citations

Bibliography

 
 
 
 

1896 births
1965 deaths
Military personnel from Berlin
People from the Province of Brandenburg
Lieutenant generals of the German Army (Wehrmacht)
Prussian Army personnel
Recipients of the Gold German Cross
Recipients of the Knight's Cross of the Iron Cross
German prisoners of war in World War I
World War I prisoners of war held by the United Kingdom
Reichswehr personnel
20th-century Freikorps personnel